A split pair is a wiring error where two wires of a twisted pair are instead connected using two wires from different pairs, potentially creating interference. Telecommunications wiring is most commonly configured using the twisted pair technique, and a split pair can cause problems like crosstalk on a phone line or interference with a video signal. These problems can indicate a wiring issue and may prompt a technician to check for signs that pairs could have been split while connecting telecommunications interfaces. Such wiring negates the benefit of using a twisted pair in the first place and is likely to cause errors in high rate data lines and increase interference on voice lines, especially on long lengths of cable.

When using registered jack connections and other connection schemes that use modular connectors, it's very easy for someone to get a split pair error. The easiest way to wire such a connector is to put the pairs next to each other, but this will not result in correct pairing.

See also
Copper cable certification

Signal cables